ASPTT Mulhouse is a French women's volleyball club based in Mulhouse and playing in the Ligue AF.

History
The club was established in 1974 and has various women's teams (girls, juniors, senior) participating in local, regional and national competitions. The senior team participated in the lower divisions of the French Championships for the first time in 1975 and has since achieved promotions to reach the Ligue AF in 1992. The club has finished second in both the Ligue AF (1997–98, 1998–99, 2006–07, 2007–08, 2008–09, 2009–10, 2010–11, 2011–12) and the French Cup (1999–00, 2008–09, 2009–10, 2011–12) and has played in European competitions (Champions League, CEV Cup and Challenge Cup) since the 1990s, including a third place in the 1997–98 CEV Cup.

The club won its first major trophy in 2016–17 by winning the French Championship.

Honours

National competitions
  French Championship: 1
2016–17

Team
Season 2017–2018, as of August 2017.

References

External links
 Official website 
 Official website  (Archived old site)

French volleyball clubs
Volleyball clubs established in 1974
1974 establishments in France
Women's volleyball in France
Sport in Mulhouse
Sport in Haut-Rhin